The Nassau Stakes is a Canadian Thoroughbred horse race held annually at Woodbine Racetrack in Toronto, Ontario. A Grade II event raced in early June, it is open to horses aged three and older and run over a distance of one mile on turf. Currently, the Nassau Stakes offers a purse of $153,540.

Inaugurated in 1956, it was raced on dirt until 1968 when it was shifted permanently to the turf. Over the years, it has been run at various distances both at the Woodbine Racetrack and at Fort Erie Race Track:

On dirt:
 7 furlongs : 1956–1958 at Woodbine
 1 mile : 1959–1966 at Woodbine, 1967 at Fort Erie

On turf:
 1 mile : beginning 2010 at Woodbine Racetrack
  miles : 1968 & 1994 at Fort Erie, 1969–1993, 1995 to present at  Woodbine

The Nassau Stakes was run in two divisions in 1978, 1982, 1983, 1985, 1989, 1990

Records
Time record:  (at  miles on turf)
 1:39.60 – Bold Ruritana (1996 on Woodbine Racetrack)

Most wins:
 2 – Belle Geste (1971, 1972)
 2 – Momigi (1976, 1977)
 2 – Pointe Aux Pins (1978, 1979)
 2 – Eternal Search (1982, 1983)
 2 – Lake Country (1985, 1986)
 2 – Radiant Ring (1991, 1992)
 2 – Bold Ruritana (1995, 1996)
 2 – Solid Appeal (2013, 2014)

Most wins by an owner:
 6 – Sam-Son Farm (1989, 1991, 1992, 1998, 2001, 2007)

Most wins by a jockey:
 5 – Todd Kabel (1994, 1998, 2001, 2004, 2007)

Most wins by a trainer:
 3 – Donnie Walker (1973, 1985, 1986)
 3 – James E. Day (1989, 1991, 1992)
 3 – Mark Frostad (1998, 2001, 2007)
 3 – Tom Skiffington Jr. (1989, 1990, 1999)

Winners of the Nassau Stakes

 In 1979, Christy's Mount finished first but was disqualified and set back to second.
 In 1992, Lady Shirl finished first but following a positive test for a banned medication was disqualified and placed last.

See also
 List of Canadian flat horse races

References
The Nassau Stakes at Pedigree Query

Graded stakes races in Canada
Open mile category horse races
Recurring sporting events established in 1956
Woodbine Racetrack
1956 establishments in Ontario